Raúl Alarcón García (born March 25, 1986) is a Spanish professional road bicycle racer. Born in Sax, Valencia, Spain, he turned professional in 2007 with UCI ProTeam . On 10 March 2021, he was suspended for doping until 23 October 2023 and was stripped of 19 victories, including wins at Volta a Portugal in 2017 and 2018.

Major results

2004 
 2nd Road race, National Junior Road Championships
2006
 Vuelta a Cantabria
1st Stages 1 & 2
2008
 10th Overall Volta a Lleida
2011
 1st Stage 4 Troféu Joaquim Agostinho
2012
 1st  Sprints classification Volta ao Algarve
2013
 1st Stage 7 Volta a Portugal
2014
 1st  Sprints classification Troféu Joaquim Agostinho
2015
 4th Overall Tour do Rio
2016
 1st  Mountains classification Vuelta a Castilla y León
 1st  Mountains classification Vuelta a Asturias
 3rd Overall Troféu Joaquim Agostinho
1st  Points classification
1st Stage 2
 4th Overall Volta a Portugal
2017
 1st  Overall Vuelta a Asturias
1st  Points classification
1st Stage 3
 1st  Overall Volta a Portugal
1st Stages 1 & 4
 2nd Overall Vuelta a la Comunidad de Madrid
1st  Points classification
1st Stage 1
 4th Overall GP Beiras e Serra da Estrela
1st Stage 3
2018
 1st  Overall GP Nacional 2 de Portugal
1st  Mountains classification
1st Stage 1
 1st  Overall Volta a Portugal
1st  Mountains classification
1st Stages 3, 4 & 9
 3rd Clássica Aldeias do Xisto
2019
 2nd Clássica da Arrábida
 3rd Overall Volta ao Alentejo

See also
 List of doping cases in cycling

References

External links
Profile at Saunier Duval-Prodir official website

1986 births
Living people
People from Alto Vinalopó
Sportspeople from the Province of Alicante
Cyclists from the Valencian Community
Spanish male cyclists
Doping cases in cycling
Spanish sportspeople in doping cases